The Subida a Arrate was a road bicycle race held annually in the Basque Country, Spain from 1941 until 1986. It then merged with the Gran Premio de la Bicicleta Eibarresa, which became the Euskal Bizikleta.

Winners

References

Cycle races in Spain
Recurring sporting events established in 1941
1941 establishments in Spain
Cycle races in the Basque Country
1986 disestablishments in Spain
Defunct cycling races in Spain
Recurring sporting events disestablished in 1986